Georgetown, Guyana was known as Stabroek prior to 1812.

Stabroek is a municipality located in the Belgian province of Antwerp. In 2021, Stabroek had a total population of 18,680. The total area is 21.51 km². In 2008 Stabroek celebrated its 750-year-old existence.

Famous inhabitants
 Thomas Vermaelen, retired Belgian football player, currently assistant coach for the Belgium national football team

References

External links
 
  Official website
  Official website for the 750-year anniversary

 
Municipalities of Antwerp Province
Populated places in Antwerp Province